Royal Swaziland Sugar Corporation United FC is a Swazi soccer club based in Mhlume. They play in the Premier League of Eswatini.

History
The team was found in 2005 by merging two teams Mhlume United and Simunye FC. Group WBIF partners and RBV United players will join the second division squad.

Current squad

Stadium
Currently the team plays at the Mhlume Stadium.

References

External links
Team profile – soccerway.com

Football clubs in Eswatini
Association football clubs established in 2005